Munch is a crater on Mercury.  It was discovered on the first flyby of Mercury by the MESSENGER spacecraft on 14 January 2008, and was named after Edvard Munch a Norwegian painter, printmaker, and draftsman (1863-1944) by the IAU in November of the same year.

Munch is west of Sander and Poe craters, within the Caloris basin.

References

Impact craters on Mercury